Timothy M. Kennedy (born October 20, 1976) is an American politician from New York. He is currently a Democratic member of the New York State Senate, representing the 63rd District since January 2013. He previously represented the 58th District from 2011 to 2013.

Early life and education 
Kennedy was raised in South Buffalo, one of five children of Martin F. and Mary Kennedy. His father worked as Buffalo's commissioner of assessment and taxation, and his mother is a retired nurse who teaches nursing at D'Youville College. He received his early education at St. Martin's Elementary School, and attended the St. Joseph's Collegiate Institute. He earned a bachelor's degree and a master's degree in occupational therapy from D'Youville College.

Career

Erie County Legislature 

In late 2004, at the age of 28, Kennedy was appointed to the Erie County Legislature, representing the 2nd District, after Mark J. F. Schroeder was elected to the State Assembly.

In 2005, Kennedy defeated Democratic primary opponent Paul Sullivan by a vote of 65% to 35%. He won 72% of the vote in the general election against his Republican opponent, Julieanne Mazurkiewicz.

In 2007, Kennedy ran unopposed for a second full term to the Erie County Legislature.

New York State Senate

Elections
In 2010, Kennedy challenged incumbent William Stachowski for the Democratic nomination for the 58th District in the New York State Senate. Kennedy also earned the endorsement of the Conservative Party, which had previously supported Stachowski. Stachowski was one of eight Democratic state senators who had voted against a bill allowing same-sex marriage in New York, while Kennedy supported it, earning him the backing of gay rights organizations in the primary. Kennedy ultimately defeated Stachowski by a margin of 63%-26%. amid a wave of anti-incumbent voter sentiment. Stachowski remained on the ballot on the Independence Party and Working Families Party lines.

In the 2010 general election, Kennedy defeated Republican Assemblyman Jack Quinn III, gaining 47% of the vote to Quinn's 45%. The remaining votes went to Stachowski.

Seeking reelection in 2012, Kennedy won a primary challenge from Democrat Betty Jean Grant, prevailing by 139 votes. The closeness of the election prompted a protracted court battle heard by Justice Joseph R. Glownia of the State Supreme Court. Kennedy ran uncontested in the November 2012 general election and was re-elected.

In 2014, Kennedy defeated Grant in a Democratic primary rematch, receiving 16,660 votes (60.2%) to Grant's 10,997 votes (39.8%). The race received much attention, with campaign spending by the candidates and outside groups surpassing $1 million. Kennedy received the backing of the New York State United Teachers and realtors, while Grant received the Erie County Democratic Committee endorsement and help from the Independent Democratic Conference, a breakaway group of state Senate Democrats who sided with Republicans in the Senate. Kennedy's base of support was South Buffalo, Lackawanna, and Cheektowaga, while Grant's base of support was Buffalo's East Side.

In the November 2014 general election, Kennedy (who ran on the Democratic, Working Families, and Independence ballot lines) defeated Ricky T. Donovan, Sr. (who ran on the Republican and Conservative ballot lines). Out of 59,094 total votes, Kennedy received 42,278 (71.5%), while Donovan received 11,973 (20.3%).

In the 2016 general election, Kennedy ran unopposed on the Democratic, Working Families, Independence, and Women's Equality ballot lines and received 89,650 votes.

In 2018, Kennedy defeated Shaqurah Zachery in a Democratic primary, winning 23,640 (76.6%) of the vote. He ran unopposed in the general election.

Tenure
In 2011, Kennedy voted in favor of the Marriage Equality Act, which legalized same-sex marriage in New York. Kennedy lost the support of the Conservative Party in 2012 following his vote on the marriage issue.

Also in 2011, Kennedy authored Jay-J's Law, which sought to stiffen penalties for repeat child abusers by increasing the look back period in which someone can be charged with aggravated assault. The bill was named after Jay-J Bolvin, a young boy who suffered 11 fractured bones, a severe seizure disorder and developmental delays as a result of a severe beating from his father, who had previously been convicted of assaulting one of his other sons. The bill was passed by the legislature and later signed into law by Governor Andrew Cuomo in July 2013.

In 2012, Kennedy introduced a package of four bills to combat the opioid epidemic in New York. One of the bills would create a prescription-monitoring system for physicians and pharmacists to track the prescription of narcotic painkillers. This proposal was made by New York State Attorney General Eric Schneiderman.

Kennedy was known as a "solid pro-life vote" during his early political career. In 2013, Kennedy cast a procedural vote for the tenth point of Gov. Andrew Cuomo's Women's Equality Act, which would have expanded abortion rights in New York. In February 2014, Kennedy acknowledged that his position on abortion had "evolved" and that he supported the tenth point of the Women's Equality Act; he added, "'I believe at the end of the day that a woman has to be able to make a decision upon her health, her life and her family that is in her best interests and their best interests'". Pro-choice groups praised his shift on the issue, while Bishop Richard Malone of the Buffalo diocese of the Roman Catholic Church criticized him for it. In 2019, Kennedy voted in favor of the Reproductive Health Act, which was described by The Buffalo News as "the most sweeping set of protections to the state’s abortion laws in 49 years".

In 2013, Kennedy co-sponsored legislation to increase the state minimum wage to $9 an hour, and automatically adjust the minimum wage to account for cost-of-living increases.

In May 2013, Kennedy introduced a Jackie's Law into the Senate, which was prompted by the death of West Seneca woman Jackie Wisniewski, who was killed after being stalked by a former boyfriend using a GPS tracking device on her car. Kennedy's bill updated New York's stalking statutes by allowing police to pursue criminal charges against those who use electronic tracking devices to stalk victims. Assemblywoman Crystal Peoples-Stokes sponsored companion legislation in the Assembly. Governor Andrew Cuomo signed the bill into law in July 2014.

In 2014, Kennedy introduced legislation that would limit the state's legal immunity for claims for damages. The legislation would specifically amend Section 58 of the State Highway Law, which immunizes the state from "liability for damages arising from defects in its highways" during cold-weather months. The bill proposed by Kennedy "would allow motorists to seek damages from the state for 'egregious or unreasonable' defects year-round or when it was given prior notice of a defect." State Assemblyman Thomas J. Abinanti filed companion legislation in the State Assembly.

Kennedy was a supporter of the legalization of mixed martial arts (MMA) in New York, which at the time was the only U.S. state to bar MMA events. Kennedy argued that MMA could economically benefit Western New York, with events at First Niagara Center in Buffalo benefiting local businesses. The legal status of MMA had been a state political issue for years; the state Senate passed legalization legislation seven times over six years, but the bills were not taken up by the State Assembly. Kennedy expressed disappointment at the failure to pass the legislation in 2015, and welcomed passage of MMA legislation in 2016.

In 2017, Kennedy supported legalizing vehicle for hire companies in all areas of New York State.

When the Democratic Party won the majority in the State Senate in 2018, Kennedy was appointed chair of the New York State Senate Transportation, Infrastructure, and Capital Investment Committee. He also serves on the Finance, Rules, Energy & Telecommunications, Insurance, Banks, and Social Services Committees.

In his first year chairing of the Senate Transportation Committee, Kennedy secured $100 million for the Niagara Frontier Transportation Authority (NFTA) Buffalo Metro Rail System. Kennedy was one of the main players in getting a new Amtrak Buffalo–Exchange Street station built.

2020 presidential election 
In the 2020 Democratic Presidential Primary, Kennedy received the most votes (43,127) as a delegate for Joe Biden to the 2020 Democratic National Convention for the 26th Congressional District.

References

1976 births
Living people
Politicians from Buffalo, New York
Democratic Party New York (state) state senators
D'Youville College alumni
21st-century American politicians
St. Joseph's Collegiate Institute alumni